Tazehabad-e Markazi (also Romanized as Tāzehābād-e Markazī; also known as Tāzeh Deh) is a village in Shamshir Rural District, in the Central District of Paveh County, Kermanshah Province, Iran. At the 2006 census, its population was 58, in 13 families.

References 

Populated places in Paveh County